Maria Spînu (born 24 March 1985) is a Moldovan footballer who plays as a defender. She has been a member of the Moldova women's national team.

See also
List of Moldova women's international footballers

References

1985 births
Living people
Women's association football defenders
Moldovan women's footballers
People from Criuleni District
Moldova women's international footballers
FC Noroc Nimoreni players
Agarista-ȘS Anenii Noi players